Karla Miguelina Echenique (born May 16, 1986 in Santo Domingo) is a volleyball player from the Dominican Republic, who played as a setter for the Women's National Team at the 2008 Olympic Qualification Tournament in Japan, but did not qualify for the 2008 Summer Olympics.  She, and the Dominican Republic team did, however, qualify for the 2012 Summer Olympics, where they finished 5th.

Personal Life: Karla has a brother and more than one sister. One of her sisters is Michelle Echenique who is a current student at The University of Florida.

Career

She won the Silver Medal with the National Junior Team at 2002 NORCECA Youth Girls' Volleyball Championship and was selected tournament "Best Setter". Same year she participated at the 2002 World Championships with the National Senior Team at the age of 15, making her the youngest player at the competition. She helped her team to reach the 13th place.

In beach volleyball she won the bronze medal at the 2006 National Championship, playing with Bethania de la Cruz.

She finished in fourth place, playing in Japan at the 2008 Olympic Qualification Tournament, and did not qualify for the 2008 Summer Olympics. Shortly afterwards she claimed the gold medal at the 2008 Women's Pan-American Volleyball Cup in Mexico.

During the Holy Week Sport Festival held in Hato Mayor, Echenique played Beach Volleyball (three) with Bethania Almanzar and Dahiana Burgos, winning the silver medal of the event.

2010
Karla played for Gigantes de Carolina for the Puerto Rican LVSF in the 2010 season, being awarded by Statistics as "Best Setter", and was also selected to the All-Star game. She helped her team to reach the quarterfinals.

Playing in Chiapas, Mexico with her National Senior Team, she won the 2010 Final Four Cup gold medal.

Karla returned to the Dominican club Mirador, to play at the 2010 FIVB Women's Club World Championship, ranking in 4th place.

2011
At the middle of the 2010/2011 season, Echenique joined the Polish team Organika Budowlani Łódź, to play at the Polish Women's-Volleyball League.

Clubs
 Deportivo Nacional (2000–2004)
 Bameso (2004–2005)
 Modeca (2005–2006)
 Mirador (2006)
 Voley Sanse Mepaban (2006–2007)
 Santiago (2008)
 Gigantes de Carolina (2010)
 Mirador (2010)
 Organika Budowlani Łódź (2010-2011)
 Lancheras de Cataño (2012-2013)
 Valencianas de Juncos (2013-2014)

Awards

Individuals
 2010 Liga de Voleibol Superior Femenino "All-Star"
 2010 World Championship NORCECA Qualification Pool H "Best Setter"
 2008 Dominican Volleyball League "Best Setter"
 2002 NORCECA Girls Youth Continental Championship U-18 "Best Server"

Beach volleyball
 2006 National Championship -  Bronze Medal
 2009 Hato Mayor Beach Volleyball Tournament  Silver Medal

National Team

Junior Team
 2002 NORCECA Girls Youth Continental Championship U-18  Silver Medal

Clubs
 2006 Dominican Republic Distrito Nacional Superior Tournament -  Champion, with Mirador
 2008 Dominican Republic Volleyball League -  3rd Place, with Santiago

References

External links
 Profile

1986 births
Living people
Sportspeople from Santo Domingo
Dominican Republic women's volleyball players
Volleyball players at the 2012 Summer Olympics
Olympic volleyball players of the Dominican Republic
Central American and Caribbean Games gold medalists for the Dominican Republic
Competitors at the 2002 Central American and Caribbean Games
Competitors at the 2006 Central American and Caribbean Games
Competitors at the 2010 Central American and Caribbean Games
Setters (volleyball)
Expatriate volleyball players in Spain
Expatriate volleyball players in Poland
Expatriate volleyball players in the United States
Dominican Republic expatriate sportspeople in Spain
Dominican Republic expatriate sportspeople in the United States
Central American and Caribbean Games medalists in volleyball